Peeya Rai Chowdhary is an Indian actress. Peeya Rai was married to model Shayan Munshi, who was a controversial witness in the murder trial of Jessica Lal. in 2006, but separated from him in 2010. She played Lakhi in Gurinder Chadha's Bride and Prejudice, Rita in the movie The Bong Connection (where she worked with husband Munshi) and played "Kiran" in the TV show Hip Hip Hurray. She studied at National College, Mumbai.

Filmography
Bhoot (2003) as Peeya
Chupke Se (2003) as Sheetal
Darna Mana Hai (2003) as Mehnaz
Vaastu Shastra (2004) (credited as Piya Rai Choudhray) as Radhika
Bride & Prejudice (2004) (credited as Peeya Rai Choudhuri) as Lakhi Bakshi
Home Delivery: Aapko... Ghar Tak (2005) as Employee at Mommy's Pizza
My Brother... Nikhil (2005) as  Catherine
The Bong Connection (2006)
The Truck of Dreams (2006)

References

External links
 

Living people
Actresses from Bangalore
Year of birth missing (living people)
Bengali Hindus
Indian film actresses
Indian women comedians
Kannada comedians
21st-century Indian actresses
Actresses in Bengali cinema